Ragim Fuadovich Sadykhov (born 18 July 1996) is a professional footballer who plays for Zira in the Azerbaijan Premier League. Born in Russia, he represents the Azerbaijan national team.

Club career
He made his debut in the Russian Professional Football League for FC Solyaris Moscow on 20 July 2015 in a game against FC Pskov-747 Pskov.

On 12 September 2019, Sadykhov signed a two-year contract with Sumgayit FK.

International career
Sadykhov made his Azerbaijan debut on 8 September 2020 against Cyprus in UEFA Nations League.

Honours

Individual
 Russian Professional Football League Zone Center best player (2018–19).

References

External links
 Profile by Russian Professional Football League
 
 Profile at UEFA.com

1996 births
Footballers from Moscow
Living people
Azerbaijani footballers
Azerbaijan international footballers
Azerbaijan youth international footballers
Azerbaijani expatriate footballers
Expatriate footballers in Russia
Azerbaijani expatriate sportspeople in Russia
Association football midfielders
FC Solyaris Moscow players
FC Torpedo Moscow players
FC Spartak Moscow players
Sumgayit FK players
Azerbaijan Premier League players